C. Fritz Foley is an American economist who is currently the André R. Jakurski Professor of Business Administration at the Harvard Business School.

Education
2002 Ph.D., Business Economics, Harvard University
1999 A.M., Economics, Harvard University
1993 B.A., Ethics, Politics and Economics, Yale University

References

Harvard Business School faculty
American economists
Harvard Graduate School of Arts and Sciences alumni
Yale College alumni
Year of birth missing (living people)
Living people